George "Duke" Benz (September 6, 1917 – June 23, 2007) was an American football coach. He served as the head football coach at Hartwick College in Oneonta, New York from 1949 to 1950 and at Norwich University in Norwich, Vermont from 1951 to 1954, compiling a record of 19–28–1.

References

1917 births
2007 deaths
Hartwick Hawks football coaches
Norwich Cadets athletic directors 
Norwich Cadets football coaches
Sportspeople from the Bronx